MOLYBARON are an Irish / French alt metal band.

History 
Molybaron was formed in late December 2014 in Paris, by Dublin born vocalist/guitarist Gary Kelly and guitarist Steven Andre. Their sound ranges from tech-grooves and anthemic metal to multi-layered atmospherics.

The band self-released Molybaron, their debut album, in May 2017. The band toured Europe with NYC metallers A Pale Horse Named Death in 2019.

The band's second studio album, 'The Mutiny', was self-released on May 21, 2021. Soon after, the band signed with record label, Inside Out Music (Sony Music) and the album will be re-released on 29 October 2021.

On its first release the album gained positive reviews from some magazines including Metal Hammer UK who wrote, “Diverse and satisfying, The Mutiny is a banger!”.

Rock Hard Magazine named 'The Mutiny' Album of the Month in their May edition.

Band members

Current members 
 Gary Kelly – guitar vocals (since 2014)
 Sébastien de Saint-Angel – bass (since 2015)
 Camille Greneron – drums (since 2019)
 Florian Soum - lead guitar (since January 2023)

Past members 
 Steven André – guitar (2014–2022)
 Raphael Bouglon – drums (2017–2018)

Timeline

Discography

Studio albums

Notes and references

External links 
 
 Music Videos:
 Lucifer (2021)
 Animals (2021)
 Twenty Four Hours (2020)
 Moly (2017)

Musical groups established in 2014
French progressive metal musical groups
Irish progressive rock groups